Homotherini is an extinct tribe (or subtribe) of carnivoran mammals of the  family Felidae (true cats). The tribe is commonly known as scimitar-toothed cats. These saber-toothed cats were distributed en North America, Europe, Asia, Africa, and South America from the Miocene to Pleistocene living from c. 23 Ma until c. 12,000 years ago.

Description
Compared to the usually massively built dirk-toothed phenotype, apparent in Smilodon, Megantereon and the feliform Barbourofelis (just to list a few), their upper canines were smaller than those of equally sized cats of that phenotype, but they had serrated edges. The scimitar-toothed phenotype has also evolved independently in other mammal families.

Evolution
Based on mitochondrial DNA sequences extracted from fossils, the lineage of Homotherium is estimated to have diverged from that of Smilodon about 18 Ma ago.

The scimitar tooth form was used to assist in the hunting of herbivorous megafauna. With its hyper sharp and serrated form it was perfect for ripping flesh off of downed prey. However, if this tooth would come into contact with bone it could get caught, serrations worn off, or even completely broken thus leaving the organism without a food source, leading to starvation and death.

There is a debate about how both the scimitar-tooth and the dirk-tooth evolved in felines and other mammals. the two sides of the debate revolve around whether it was derived from a sexual dimorphic trait or if it was completely natural selection that drove the creation of these phenotypes. The argument for sexual dimorphic origins stems from the fact that in mammals sexual dimorphic traits manifest as tools for males to compete for females. It is believed that the scimitar-tooth and the dirk-tooth were originally only in males for use in competition but then with the rise of mega-herbivores it became favorable for females to take up the trait as well. The natural selection side of the debate argues that the scimitar and dirk-tooth both evolved because of the unfilled niche of predation of megaherbivores so the trait evolved to take advantage of said niche.

Classification

Phylogeny
The phylogenetic relationships of Homotherini are shown in the following cladogram:

References

 
Machairodontinae
Mammal tribes
Miocene carnivorans
Pliocene carnivorans
Pleistocene carnivorans
Pleistocene extinctions
Miocene first appearances
Saber-toothed cats
Prehistoric mammals of North America
Prehistoric mammals of Europe